Mutualism is an anarchist school of thought and economic theory that advocates a socialist society based on free markets and usufructs, i.e. occupation and use property norms. One implementation of this system involves the establishment of a mutual-credit bank that would lend to producers at a minimal interest rate, just high enough to cover administration. Mutualism is based on a version of the labor theory of value that it uses as its basis for determining economic value. According to mutualist theory, when a worker sells the product of their labor, they ought to receive money, goods, or services in exchange that are equal in economic value, embodying "the amount of labor necessary to produce an article of exactly similar and equal utility". The product of the worker's labour factors the amount of both mental and physical labour into the price of their product.

While mutualism was popularized by the writings of anarchist philosopher Pierre-Joseph Proudhon and is mainly associated as an anarchist school of thought and with libertarian socialism, its origins as a type of socialism go back to the 18th-century labour movement in Britain first, then France and finally to the working-class Chartist movement and Boston Anarchists. Mutualists oppose individuals receiving income through loans, investments and rent under capitalist social relations. Although opposed to this type of income, Proudhon expressed that he had never intended "to forbid or suppress, by sovereign decree, ground rent and interest on capital. I think that all these manifestations of human activity should remain free and voluntary for all: I ask for them no modifications, restrictions or suppressions, other than those which result naturally and of necessity from the universalization of the principle of reciprocity which I propose."

As long as they ensure the worker's right to the full product of their labour, mutualists support markets and property in the product of labour, differentiating between capitalist private property (productive property) and personal property (private property). Mutualists argue for conditional titles to land, whose ownership is legitimate only so long as it remains in use or occupation (which Proudhon called possession), a type of private property with strong abandonment criteria. This contrasts with the capitalist non-proviso labour theory of property, where an owner maintains a property title more or less until one decides to give or sell it.

As libertarian socialists, mutualists distinguish their market socialism from state socialism and do not advocate state ownership over the means of production. Instead, each person possesses a means of production, either individually or collectively, with trade representing equivalent amounts of labour in the free market. Benjamin Tucker wrote of Proudhon that "though opposed to socializing the ownership of capital, he aimed nevertheless to socialize its effects by making its use beneficial to all instead of a means of impoverishing the many to enrich the few ... by subjecting capital to the natural law of competition, thus bringing the price of its own use down to cost".

Although similar to the economic doctrines of the 19th-century American individualist anarchists, mutualism favours large industries. Mutualism has been retrospectively characterized sometimes as being a form of individualist anarchism and ideologically situated between individualist and collectivist forms of anarchism. Proudhon described the liberty he pursued as "the synthesis of communism and property". Some consider mutualism part of free-market anarchism, individualist anarchism and market-oriented left-libertarianism, while others regard it as part of social anarchism.

History

Origins 

As a term, mutualism has seen a variety of related uses. Charles Fourier first used the French term mutualisme in 1822, although the reference was not to an economic system. The first use of the noun mutualist was in the New-Harmony Gazette by an American Owenite in 1826. In the early 1830s, a French labour organization in Lyons called themselves the Mutuellists. In What Is Mutualism?, the American mutualist Clarence Lee Swartz defined it this way:
A social system based on equal freedom, reciprocity, and the sovereignty of the individual over himself, his affairs and his products; realized through individual initiative, free contract, cooperation, competition and voluntary association for defense against the invasive and for the protection of life, liberty and property of the non-invasive.Political Science Quarterly (1928). 43. p. 639.

In general, mutualism can be considered the original anarchy since the mutualist Pierre-Joseph Proudhon was the first person to identify himself as an anarchist. Although mutualism is generally associated with anarchism, it is not necessarily anarchist. According to William Batchelder Greene did not become a "full-fledged anarchist" until the last decade of his life, but his writings show that by 1850 he had articulated a Christian mutualism, drawing heavily on the writings of Proudhon's sometimes-antagonist Pierre Leroux. The Christian mutualist form or anarchist branch of distributism and the works of distributists such as Dorothy Day and the Catholic Worker Movement can be considered a form of mutualism, or free-market libertarian socialism, due to their opposition to both state capitalism and state socialism. According to A Mutualist FAQ, mutualism was "the original form taken by the labor movement, first in Great Britain and shortly thereafter in France and the rest of Western Europe. Both mutualist practice and theory arose as part of the broad current of working class radicalism in England, from around the time of the publication of Paine's Rights of Man and the organization of the first Societies of Correspondence in the 1790s, to the Chartist movement. Mutualism existed for some time as a spontaneous working class practice before it was formalized in theory."

Proudhon was involved with the Lyons mutualists and later adopted the name to describe his teachings. In What Is Mutualism?, Swartz gives his account of the origin of the term, claiming that "[t]he word 'mutualism' seems to have been first used by John Gray, an English writer, in 1832". When Gray's 1825 Lecture on Human Happiness was first published in the United States in 1826, the publishers appended the Preamble and Constitution of the Friendly Association for Mutual Interests, Located at Valley Forge. 1826 also saw the publication of the Constitution of the Friendly Association for Mutual Interests at Kendal, Ohio. Of Proudhon's philosophy, Geoffrey Ostergaard summarized, "he argued that working men should emancipate themselves, not by political but by economic means, through the voluntary organization of their own labour—a concept to which he attached redemptive value. His proposed system of equitable exchange between self-governing producers, organized individually or in association and financed by free credit, was called 'mutualism'. The units of the radically decentralized and pluralistic social order that he envisaged were to be linked at all levels by applying 'the federal principle.'"

The authors of A Mutualist FAQ quote E. P. Thompson's description of the early working-class movement as mutualism. Thompson argued that it was "powerfully shaped by the sensibilities of urban artisans and weavers who combined a 'sense of lost independence' with 'memories of their golden age.' The weavers in particular carried a strong communitarian and egalitarian sensibility, basing their radicalism, 'whether voiced in Owenite or biblical language,' on 'essential rights and elementary notions of human fellowship and conduct.'" Thompson further wrote: "It was as a whole community that they demanded betterment, and utopian notions of redesigning society anew at a stroke—Owenite communities, the universal general strike, the Chartist Land Plan—swept through them like fire on the common. But essentially the dream which arose in many different forms was the same—a community of independent small producers, exchanging their products without the distortions of masters and middlemen."

Mutualist anti-capitalism originates in the Jacobin-influenced radicalism of the 1790s, which saw exploitation mainly in taxation and feudal landlordism in that "government appears as court parasitism: taxes are a form of robbery, for pensioners and for wars of conquest." In Constantin François de Chassebœuf, comte de Volney's Ruins of Empire, the nation was divided between those who "by useful laborus contribute to the support and maintenance of society" and "the parasites who lived off them", namely "none but priests, courtiers, public accountants, commanders of troops, in short, the civil, military, or religious agents of government." This was summarized by the following statement:
People.... What labour do you perform in the society?Privileged Class. None: we are not made to labour.People. How then have you acquired your wealth?Privileged Class. By taking the pains to govern you.People. To govern us!... We toil, and you enjoy; we produce and you dissipate; wealth flows from us, and you absorb it. Privileged men, class distinct from the people, form a class apart and govern yourselves.

According to the authors of A Mutualist FAQ, "it would be a mistake to make a sharp distinction between this analysis and the later critique of capitalism. The heritage of the manorial economy and the feudal aristocracy blurred the distinction between the state and the economic ruling class. But such a distinction is largely imaginary in any social system. The main difference is that manorialism was openly founded on conquest, whereas capitalism hid its exploitative character behind a facade of 'neutral' laws." They further write that "[t]he critique of pre-capitalist authority structures had many features that could be expanded by analogy to the critique of capitalism. The mutualist analysis of capitalism as a system of state-enforced privilege is a direct extension of the Jacobin/radical critique of the landed aristocracy. The credit and patent monopolies were attacked on much the same principles as the radicals of the 1790s attacked seigneural rents. There was a great continuity of themes from the 1790s through Owenist and Chartist times. One such theme was the importance of widespread, egalitarian property ownership by the laboring classes, and the inequity of concentrating property ownership in the hands of a few non-producers." According to them, this prefigured distributism. Other notable people mentioned as influences on mutualism include John Ball and Wat Tyler as part of the Peasants' Revolt, William Cobbett, the English Dissenter and radical offshoots of Methodism such as the Primitive Methodists and the New Connexion, as well as the more secular versions of republicanism and economic populism going back to the Diggers and the Levellers, the Fifth Monarchists, William Godwin, Robert Owen, Thomas Paine, Thomas Spence and the Quakers.

By 1846, Proudhon was speaking of "mutuality" (mutualité) in his writings, and he used the term "mutualism" (mutuellisme) at least as early as 1848 in his Programme Révolutionnaire. In 1850, Greene used the term mutualism to describe a mutual credit system similar to that of Proudhon. In 1850, the American newspaper The Spirit of the Age, edited by William Henry Channing, published proposals for a mutualist township by Joshua King Ingalls and Albert Brisbane, together with works by Proudhon, Greene, Leroux and others.

Proudhon ran for the French Constituent Assembly in April 1848 but was not elected, although his name appeared on the ballots in Paris, Lyon, Besançon and Lille. He was successful in the complementary elections of 4 June and served as a deputy during the debates over the National Workshops, created by the 25 February 1848 decree passed by Republican Louis Blanc. The workshops were to give work to the unemployed. Proudhon was never enthusiastic about such workshops, perceiving them as charitable institutions that did not resolve the problems of the economic system. He was against their elimination unless an alternative could be found for the workers who relied on the workshops for subsistence.

Proudhon was surprised by the French Revolution of 1848. He participated in the February uprising and the composition of what he termed "the first republican proclamation" of the new republic. However, he had misgivings about the new provisional government headed by Jacques-Charles Dupont de l'Eure (1767–1855), who since the French Revolution in 1789 had been a longstanding politician, although often in the opposition. Proudhon published his perspective for reform, completed in 1849, titled Solution du problème social (Solution of the Social Problem), in which he laid out a program of mutual financial cooperation among workers. He believed this would transfer control of economic relations from capitalists and financiers to workers. The central part of his plan was establishing a bank to provide credit at a very low interest rate and issuing exchange notes that would circulate instead of money based on gold.

19th-century United States 
Mutualism was especially prominent in the United States and advocated by American individualist anarchists. While individualist anarchists in Europe are pluralists who advocate anarchism without adjectives and synthesis anarchism, ranging from anarcho-communist to mutualist economic types, most individualist anarchists in the United States advocate mutualism as a libertarian socialist form of market socialism or a free-market socialist form of classical economics.

Mutualism has been associated with two types of currency reform. Labour notes were first discussed in Owenite circles and received their first practical test in 1827 in the Time Store of former New Harmony member and individualist anarchist Josiah Warren. Mutual banking aimed at the monetization of all forms of wealth and the extension of free credit. It is most closely associated with William Batchelder Greene, but Greene drew from the work of Proudhon, Edward Kellogg and William Beck and from the land bank tradition. Within individualist anarchist circles, mutualism meant non-communist anarchism or non-communist socialism.

Historian Wendy McElroy reports that American individualist anarchism received an important influence from three European thinkers. One of the most important influences was the French political philosopher Pierre-Joseph Proudhon, whose words "Liberty is not the Daughter But the Mother of Order" appeared as a motto on Libertys masthead. Liberty was an influential American individualist anarchist publication by Benjamin Tucker. For American anarchist historian Eunice Minette Schuster, "[i]t is apparent ... that Proudhonian Anarchism was to be found in the United States at least as early as 1848 and that it was not conscious of its affinity to the Individualist Anarchism of Josiah Warren and Stephen Pearl Andrews. ... William B. Greene presented this Proudhonian Mutualism in its purest and most systematic form".

After 1850, Greene became active in labour reform. He was elected vice-president of the New England Labor Reform League, the majority of the members holding to Proudhon's scheme of mutual banking, and in 1869, the Massachusetts Labor Union president. He then publishes Socialistic, Communistic, Mutualistic, and Financial Fragments (1875). He saw mutualism as the synthesis of "liberty and order". His "associationism ... is checked by individualism. ... 'Mind your own business,' 'Judge not that ye be not judged.' Over matters which are purely personal, as for example, moral conduct, the individual is sovereign as well as over that which he himself produces. For this reason, he demands 'mutuality' in marriage—the equal right of a woman to her own personal freedom and property".

In Individual Liberty, Tucker later connected his economic views with those of Proudhon, Warren and Karl Marx, taking sides with the first two while also arguing against American anti-socialists who declared socialism as imported, writing:
The economic principles of Modern Socialism are a logical deduction from the principle laid down by Adam Smith in the early chapters of his Wealth of Nations, – namely, that labor is the true measure of price. ... Half a century or more after Smith enunciated the principle above stated, Socialism picked it up where he had dropped it, and in following it to its logical conclusions, made it the basis of a new economic philosophy. ... This seems to have been done independently by three different men, of three different nationalities, in three different languages: Josiah Warren, an American; Pierre J. Proudhon, a Frenchman; Karl Marx, a German Jew. ... That the work of this interesting trio should have been done so nearly simultaneously would seem to indicate that Socialism was in the air, and that the time was ripe and the conditions favorable for the appearance of this new school of thought. So far as priority of time is concerned, the credit seems to belong to Warren, the American, – a fact which should be noted by the stump orators who are so fond of declaiming against Socialism as an imported article.

19th-century Spain 

Mutualist ideas found fertile ground in the 19th century in Spain. In Spain, Ramón de la Sagra established the anarchist journal El Porvenir in A Coruña in 1845, inspired by Proudhon's ideas. The Catalan politician Francesc Pi i Margall became the principal translator of Proudhon's works into Spanish and later briefly became president of Spain in 1873 while being the leader of the Democratic Republican Federal Party. According to George Woodcock, "[t]hese translations were to have a profound and lasting effect on the development of Spanish anarchism after 1870, but before that time Proudhonian ideas, as interpreted by Pi, already provided much of the inspiration for the federalist movement which sprang up in the early 1860's [sic]".

According to the Encyclopædia Britannica, "[d]uring the Spanish revolution of 1873, Pi y Margall attempted to establish a decentralized, or cantonalist, political system on Proudhonian lines". Pi i Margall was a dedicated theorist in his own right, especially through book-length works such as La reacción y la revolución (Reaction and Revolution from 1855), Las nacionalidades (Nationalities from 1877) and La Federación (The Federation from 1880). For prominent anarcho-syndicalist Rudolf Rocker, "[t]he first movement of the Spanish workers was strongly influenced by the ideas of Pi y Margall, leader of the Spanish Federalists and disciple of Proudhon. Pi y Margall was one of the outstanding theorists of his time and had a powerful influence on the development of libertarian ideas in Spain. His political ideas had much in common with those of Richard Price, Joseph Priestly [sic], Thomas Paine, Jefferson, and other representatives of the Anglo-American liberalism of the first period. He wanted to limit the power of the state to a minimum and gradually replace it by a Socialist economic order".

First International and Paris Commune 
According to a historian of the First International, G. M. Stekloff, in April 1856, "arrived from Paris a deputation of Proudhonist workers whose aim it was to bring about the foundation of a Universal League of Workers. The object of the League was the social emancipation of the working class, which, it was held, could only be achieved by a union of the workers of all lands against international capital. Since the deputation was one of Proudhonists, of course this emancipation was to be secured, not by political methods, but purely by economic means, through the foundation of productive and distributive co-operatives". Stekloff continues by saying that "[i]t was in the 1863 elections that for the first time workers' candidates were run in opposition to bourgeois republicans, but they secured very few votes. ... [A] group of working-class Proudhonists (among whom were Murat and Tolain, who were subsequently to participate in the founding of the (First) International issued the famous Manifesto of the Sixty, which, though extremely moderate in tone, marked a turning point in the history of the French movement. For years and years the bourgeois liberals had been insisting that the revolution of 1789 had abolished class distinctions. The Manifesto of the Sixty loudly proclaimed that classes still existed. These classes were the bourgeoisie and the proletariat. The latter had its specific class interests, which none but workers could be trusted to defend. The inference drawn by the Manifesto was that there must be independent working-class candidates".

For Stekloff, "the Proudhonists, who were at that date the leaders of the French section of the International. They looked upon the International Workingmen's Association as a sort of academy or synagogue, where Talmudists or similar experts could "investigate" the workers' problem; wherein the spirit of Proudhon they could excogitate means for an accurate solution of the problem without being disturbed by the stresses of a political campaign. Thus Fribourg, voicing the opinions of the Parisian group of the Proudhonists (Tolain and Co.), assured his readers that "the International was the greatest attempt ever made in modern times to aid the proletariat towards the conquest, by peaceful, constitutional, and moral methods, of the place which rightly belongs to the workers in the sunshine of civilisation". According to Stekoff, the Belgian Federation "threw in its lot with the anarchist International at its Brussels Congress, held in December, 1872. ... [T]hose taking part in the socialist movement of the Belgian intelligentsia were inspired by Proudhonist ideas which naturally led them to oppose the Marxist outlook".

Mutualism also had a considerable influence on the Paris Commune. George Woodcock manifests that "a notable contribution to the activities of the Commune and particularly to the organization of public services was made by members of various anarchist factions, including the mutualists Courbet, Longuet, and Vermorel, the libertarian collectivists Varlin, Malon, and Lefrangais, and the bakuninists Elie and Elisée Reclus and Louise Michel".

21st century 

19th-century mutualists considered themselves libertarian socialists and are still considered libertarian socialists today. While oriented towards cooperation, mutualists favour free-market solutions, believing that most inequalities result from preferential conditions created by government intervention. Mutualism is a middle way between classical economics and socialism of the collectivist variety, with some characteristics of both. As for capital goods (manufactured and non-land means of production), mutualist opinion differs on whether these should be common property and commonly managed public assets or private property in the form of worker cooperatives, for as long as they ensure the worker's right to the full product of their labour, mutualists support markets and property in the product of labour, differentiating between capitalist private property (productive property) and personal property (private property).

Contemporary mutualist Kevin Carson considers mutualism to be free-market socialism. Proudhon supported labor-owned cooperative firms and associations, for "we need not hesitate, for we have no choice. ... [I]t is necessary to form an association among workers ... because without that, they would remain related as subordinates and superiors, and there would ensue two ... castes of masters and wage-workers, which is repugnant to a free and democratic society" and so "it becomes necessary for the workers to form themselves into democratic societies, with equal conditions for all members, on pain of a relapse into feudalism". In the preface to his Studies in Mutualist Political Economy, Carson describes this work as "an attempt to revive individualist anarchist political economy, to incorporate the useful developments of the last hundred years, and to make it relevant to the problems of the twenty-first century". Carson holds that capitalism has been founded on "an act of robbery as massive as feudalism" and argues that capitalism could not exist in the absence of a state. He says that "[i]t is state intervention that distinguishes capitalism from the free market". Carson does not define capitalism in the idealized sense, but he says that when he talks about capitalism, he is referring to what he calls actually existing capitalism. Carson believes the term laissez-faire capitalism is an oxymoron because capitalism, he argues, is an "organization of society, incorporating elements of tax, usury, landlordism, and tariff, which thus denies the Free Market while pretending to exemplify it". Carsons says he has no quarrel with anarcho-capitalists who use the term laissez-faire capitalism and distinguish it from actually existing capitalism. Although Carson says he has deliberately chosen to resurrect an old definition of the term. Many anarchists, including mutualists, continue to use the term and do not consider it an old definition. Carson argues that the centralization of wealth into a class hierarchy is due to state intervention to protect the ruling class by using a money monopoly, granting patents and subsidies to corporations, imposing discriminatory taxation and intervening militarily to gain access to international markets. Carson's thesis is that an authentic and free market economy would not be capitalism as the separation of labour from ownership and the subordination of labour to capital would be impossible, bringing a classless society where people could easily choose between working as a freelancer, working for a living wage, taking part of a cooperative, or being an entrepreneur. As Benjamin Tucker before, Carson notes that a mutualist free-market system would involve significantly different property rights than capitalism, particularly regarding land and intellectual property.

Following Proudhon, mutualists are libertarian socialists who consider themselves part of the market socialist tradition and the socialist movement. However, some contemporary mutualists outside the classical anarchist tradition, such as those involved in the market-oriented left-libertarianism within the Alliance of the Libertarian Left and the Voluntary Cooperation Movement, abandoned the labour theory of value and prefer to avoid the term socialist due to its association with state socialism throughout the 20th century. Nonetheless, those contemporary mutualists are part of the libertarian left and "still retain some cultural attitudes, for the most part, that set them off from the libertarian right. Most of them view mutualism as an alternative to capitalism, and believe that capitalism as it exists is a statist system with exploitative features".

According to historian James J. Martin, the individualist anarchists in the United States were socialists whose support for the labour theory of value made their libertarian socialist form of mutualism a free-market socialist alternative to capitalism and Marxism.

Theory 
The primary aspects of mutualism are free association, free banking, reciprocity in the form of mutual aid, workplace democracy, workers' self-management, gradualism and dual power. Mutualism is often described by its proponents as advocating an anti-capitalist free market. Mutualists argue that most of the economic problems associated with capitalism each amount to a violation of the cost principle, or as Josiah Warren interchangeably said, the cost the limit of price. It was inspired by the labour theory of value, which was popularized—although not invented—by Adam Smith in 1776 (Proudhon mentioned Smith as an inspiration). The labor theory of value holds that the actual price of a thing (or the true cost) is the amount of labor undertaken to produce it. In Warren's terms of his cost the limit of price theory, cost should be the limit of price, with cost referring to the amount of labour required to produce a good or service. Anyone who sells goods should charge no more than the cost to himself of acquiring these goods.

Contract and federation 
Mutualism holds that producers should exchange their goods at cost-value using contract systems. While Proudhon's early definitions of cost-value were based on fixed assumptions about the value of labour hours, he later redefined cost-value to include other factors such as the labour intensity, the nature of the work involved, etc. He also expanded his notions of contract into expanded notions of federation. Proudhon argued:
I have shown the contractor, at the birth of industry, negotiating on equal terms with his comrades, who have since become his workmen. It is plain, in fact, that this original equality was bound to disappear through the advantageous position of the master and the dependent position of the wage-workers. In vain does the law assure the right of each to enterprise. ... When an establishment has had leisure to develop itself, enlarge its foundations, ballast itself with capital, and assure itself a body of patrons, what can a workman do against a power so superior?

Dual power and gradualism 
Dual power is the process of building alternative institutions to the ones that already exist in modern society. Initially theorized by Proudhon, it has become adopted by many anti-state movements such as agorism and autonomism. Proudhon described it as follows:
Beneath the governmental machinery, in the shadow of political institutions, out of the sight of statemen and priests, society is producing its own organism, slowly and silently; and constructing a new order, the expression of its vitality and autonomy.

As Proudhon also theorized it, dual power should not be confused with the dual power popularized by Vladimir Lenin. Proudhon's meaning refers to a more specific scenario where a revolutionary entity intentionally maintains the structure of the previous political institutions until the power of the previous institution is weakened enough such that the revolutionary entity can overtake it entirely. Dual power, as implemented by mutualists, is the development of the alternative institution itself.

Free association 
Mutualists argue that association is only necessary where there is an organic combination of forces. An operation requires specialization and many different workers performing tasks to complete a unified product, i.e. a factory. In this situation, workers are inherently dependent on each other; without association, they are related as subordinate and superior, master and wage-slave. An operation that an individual can perform without the help of specialized workers does not require association. Proudhon argued that peasants do not require societal form and only feigned association for solidarity in abolishing rents, buying clubs, etc. He recognized that their work is inherently sovereign and free. In commenting on the degree of association that is preferable, Proudhon wrote:
In cases in which production requires great division of labour, it is necessary to form an association among the workers ... because without that they would remain isolated as subordinates and superiors, and there would ensue two industrial castes of masters and wage workers, which is repugnant in a free and democratic society. But where the product can be obtained by the action of an individual or a family, ... there is no opportunity for association.

For Proudhon, mutualism involved creating industrial democracy. In this system, workplaces would be "handed over to democratically organised workers' associations. ... We want these associations to be models for agriculture, industry and trade, the pioneering core of that vast federation of companies and societies woven into the common cloth of the democratic social Republic". Under mutualism, workers would no longer sell their labour to a capitalist but rather work for themselves in co-operatives. Proudhon urged "workers to form themselves into democratic societies, with equal conditions for all members, on pain of a relapse into feudalism". This would result in "[c]apitalistic and proprietary exploitation, stopped everywhere, the wage system abolished, equal and just exchange guaranteed".

As Robert Graham notes, "Proudhon's market socialism is indissolubly linked to his notions of industrial democracy and workers' self-management". K. Steven Vincent notes in his in-depth analysis of this aspect of Proudhon's ideas that "Proudhon consistently advanced a program of industrial democracy which would return control and direction of the economy to the workers". For Proudhon, "strong workers' associations ... would enable the workers to determine jointly by election how the enterprise was to be directed and operated on a day-to-day basis".

Mutual credit 

Mutualists support mutual credit and argue that free banking should be taken back by the people to establish systems of free credit. They contend that banks have a monopoly on credit, just as capitalists have a monopoly on the means of production and landlords have a land monopoly. Banks create money by lending out deposits that do not belong to them and then charging interest on the difference. Mutualists argue that by establishing a democratically run mutual savings bank or credit union, it would be possible to issue free credit so that money could be created for the participants' benefit rather than the bankers' benefit. Individualist anarchists noted for their detailed views on mutualist banking include Pierre-Joseph Proudhon, William Batchelder Greene and Lysander Spooner.

In a session of the French legislature, Proudhon proposed a government-imposed income tax to fund his mutual banking scheme, with some tax brackets reaching as high as 33 percent and 50 percent, but the legislature turned it down. This income tax Proudhon proposed to fund his bank was to be levied on rents, interest, debts and salaries. Specifically, Proudhon's proposed law required all capitalists and stockholders to disburse one-sixth of their income to their tenants and debtors and another sixth to the national treasury to fund the bank.

This scheme was vehemently objected to by others in the legislature, including Frédéric Bastiat. The reason for rejecting the income tax was that it would result in economic ruin and violate "the right of property". Proudhon once proposed funding a national bank with a voluntary tax of 1% in his debates with Bastiat. Proudhon also argued for the abolition of all taxes.

Property 
Pierre-Joseph Proudhon was an anarchist and socialist philosopher who articulated thoughts on the nature of property. He claimed that "property is theft", "property is liberty", and "property is impossible". According to Colin Ward, Proudhon did not see a contradiction between these slogans. This was because Proudhon distinguished between what he considered to be two distinct forms of property often bound up in a single label. To the mutualist, this is the distinction between property created by coercion and property created by labour. Property is theft "when it is related to a landowner or capitalist whose ownership is derived from conquest or exploitation and [is] only maintained through the state, property laws, police, and an army". Property is freedom for "the peasant or artisan family [who have] a natural right to a home, land [they may] cultivate, ... to tools of a trade" and the fruits of that cultivation—but not to ownership or control of the lands and lives of others. The former is considered illegitimate property, while the latter is legitimate property. Some individualist anarchists and followers of Proudhon's mutualism, such as Benjamin Tucker, started calling possession property or private property, causing confusion within the anarchist movement and among other socialists.

Proudhon argued that property in the product of labour is essential to liberty, while property that strayed from possession ("occupancy and use") was the basis for tyranny and would lead society to destroy itself. The conception of entitlement property as a destructive force and illegitimate institution can be seen in this quote by Proudhon, who argued:
Then if we are associated for the sake of liberty, equality, and security, we are not associated for the sake of property; then if property is a natural right, this natural right is not social, but anti-social. Property and society are utterly irreconcilable institutions. It is as impossible to associate two proprietors as to join two magnets by their opposite poles. Either society must perish, or it must destroy property. If property is a natural, absolute, imprescriptible, and inalienable right, why, in all ages, has there been so much speculation as to its origin? – for this is one of its distinguishing characteristics. The origin of a natural right! Good God! who ever inquired into the origin of the rights of liberty, security, or equality?

In What Is Mutualism?, Clarence Lee Swartz wrote:
It is, therefore, one of the purposes of Mutualists, not only to awaken in the people the appreciation of and desire for freedom, but also to arouse in them a determination to abolish the legal restrictions now placed upon non-invasive human activities and to institute, through purely voluntary associations, such measures as will liberate all of us from the exactions of privilege and the power of concentrated capital.Bojicic, Savo (2010). America America or Is It? Bloomington: AuthorHouse. p. 369. .

Swartz also argued that mutualism differs from anarcho-communism and other collectivist philosophies by its support of private property, writing: "One of the tests of any reform movement with regard to personal liberty is this: Will the movement prohibit or abolish private property? If it does, it is an enemy of liberty. For one of the most important criteria of freedom is the right to private property in the products of ones labor. State Socialists, Communists, Syndicalists and Communist-Anarchists deny private property." However, Proudhon warned that a society with private property would lead to statist relations between people, arguing:
The purchaser draws boundaries, fences himself in, and says, 'This is mine; each one by himself, each one for himself.' Here, then, is a piece of land upon which, henceforth, no one has right to step, save the proprietor and his friends; which can benefit nobody, save the proprietor and his servants. Let these multiply, and soon the people ... will have nowhere to rest, no place of shelter, no ground to till. They will die of hunger at the proprietor's door, on the edge of that property which was their birth-right; and the proprietor, watching them die, will exclaim, 'So perish idlers and vagrants.'

Unlike capitalist private-property supporters, Proudhon stressed equality. He thought that all workers should own property and have access to capital, stressing that in every cooperative, "every worker employed in the association [must have] an undivided share in the property of the company". This distinction Proudhon made between different kinds of property has been articulated by some later anarchist and socialist theorists as one of the first distinctions between private property and personal property, with the latter having direct use-value to the individual possessing it. For Proudhon, as he wrote in the sixth study of his General Idea of the Revolution in the Nineteenth Century, the capitalist's employee was "subordinated, exploited: his permanent condition is one of obedience".

Usufruct 
Mutualists believe that land should not be a commodity to be bought and sold, advocating for conditional titles to land based on occupancy and use norms. Mutualists argue whether an individual has a legitimate claim to land ownership if he is not currently using it but has already incorporated his labour into it. All mutualists agree that everything produced by human labour and machines can be owned as personal property. Mutualists reject the idea of non-personal property and non-proviso Lockean sticky property. Any property obtained through violence, bought with money gained through exploitation, or bought with money that was gained violating usufruct property norms is considered illegitimate.

According to mutualist theory, the main problem with capitalism is that it allows for non-personal property ownership. Under these conditions, a person can buy property they do not physically use with the only goal of owning said property to prevent others from using it, putting them in an economically weak position, vulnerable enough to be controlled and exploited. Mutualists argue that this is historically how certain people were able to become capitalists. According to mutualism, capitalists make money by exercising power rather than labouring. Over time, under these conditions, there emerged a minority class of individuals who owned all the means of production as non-personal property (the capitalist class) and a large class of individuals with no access to the means of production (the labouring class). The labouring class does not have direct access to the means of production and therefore is forced to sell the only thing they can to survive, i.e. their labour power, giving up their freedom to someone who owns the means of production in exchange for a wage. A worker's wage is always less than the value of the goods and services he produces. If an employer pays a labourer equal to the value of the goods and services he produces, then the capitalist would break even at most. In reality, the capitalist pays his worker less, and after subtracting overhead, the remaining difference is exploited profit which the capitalist has gained without working. Mutualists point out that the money capitalists use to buy new means of production is the surplus value they exploit from labourers.

Mutualists also argue that capitalists maintain ownership of their non-personal properties because they support state violence by funding election campaigns. The state protects capitalist non-personal property ownership against direct occupation and use by the public in exchange for money and election support. Capitalists can then continue buying labour power and the means of production as non-personal property and extracting surplus value from more labourers, continuing the cycle. Mutualist theory states that by establishing usufruct property norms, exclusive non-personal ownership of the means of production by the capitalist class would be eliminated. The labouring classes would then have direct access to means of production, enabling them to work and produce freely in worker-owned enterprises while retaining the full value of whatever they sell. Wage labour in the form of wage slavery would be eliminated, and it would be impossible to become a capitalist because the widespread labour market would no longer exist. No one would be able to own the means of production in the form of non-personal property, two ingredients necessary for labour exploitation. This would result in the capitalist class labouring with the rest of society.

Criticism

Anarchism 
In Europe, a contemporary critic of Proudhon was the early libertarian communist Joseph Déjacque, who was able to serialise his book L'Humanisphère, Utopie anarchique (The Humanisphere: Anarchic Utopia) in his periodical Le Libertaire, Journal du Mouvement Social (Libertarian: Journal of Social Movement), published in 27 issues from 9 June 1858 to 4 February 1861 while living in New York. Unlike and against Proudhon, he argued that "it is not the product of his or her labor that the worker has a right to, but to the satisfaction of his or her needs, whatever may be their nature". In his critique of Proudhon, Déjacque also coined the word libertarian and argued that Proudhon was merely a liberal, a moderate, suggesting he become "frankly and completely an anarchist" instead by giving up all forms of authority and property. Since then, the word libertarian has been used to describe this consistent anarchism which rejected private and public hierarchies along with property in the products of labour and the means of production. Libertarianism is frequently used as a synonym for anarchism and libertarian socialism.

One area of disagreement between anarcho-communists and mutualists stems from Proudhon's alleged advocacy of labour vouchers to compensate individuals for their labour and markets or artificial markets for goods and services. However, the persistent claim that Proudhon proposed a labour currency has been challenged as a misunderstanding or misrepresentation. Like other anarcho-communists, Peter Kropotkin advocated the abolition of labour remuneration and questioned, "how can this new form of wages, the labor note, be sanctioned by those who admit that houses, fields, mills are no longer private property, that they belong to the commune or the nation?" According to George Woodcock, Kropotkin believed that a wage system, whether "administered by Banks of the People or by workers' associations through labor cheques", is a form of compulsion.

Collectivist anarchist Mikhail Bakunin was an adamant critic of Proudhonian mutualism as well, stating: "How ridiculous are the ideas of the individualists of the Jean Jacques Rousseau school and of the Proudhonian mutualists who conceive society as the result of the free contract of individuals absolutely independent of one another and entering into mutual relations only because of the convention drawn up among men. As if these men had dropped from the skies, bringing with them speech, will, original thought, and as if they were alien to anything of the earth, that is, anything having social origin". Bakunin also specifically criticized Proudhon, stating that "[d]espite all his efforts to free himself from the traditions of classical idealism, Proudhon remained an incorrigible idealist all his life, swayed at one moment by the Bible and the next by Roman Law (as I told him two months before he died)." According to Paul McLaughlin, Bakunin held that "'Proudhon, in spite of all his efforts to shake off the tradition of classical idealism, remained all his life an incorrigible idealist', 'unable to surmount idealistic phantoms' in spite of himself. It is Bakunin's purpose to rid Proudhon's libertarian thought of its metaphysicality, that is, to naturalize his anarchism — thereby overcoming its abstract, indeed reactionary, individualism and transforming it into a social anarchism."

Capitalism 

The pro-capitalism criticism is due to the different conceptions of property rights between capitalism and mutualism. The latter supports free access to capital, the means of production and natural resources, arguing that permanent private ownership of land and capital results in monopolization without equal liberty of access. Mutualism also argues that a society with capitalist private property inevitably leads to statist relations between people.

See also 

 Democratic socialism
 Economic democracy
 Geolibertarianism
 Georgism
 Guild socialism
 History of anarchism
 History of socialism
 Mutualism (movement)
 Scientific socialism
 Social democracy
 Socialist economics
 Syndicalism
 Utopian socialism

References

Bibliography 
 Backer, Thomas B. (1978). The Mutualists: The Heirs of Proudhon in the First International, 1865–1878. University of Cincinnati.
 Wilbur, Shawn P. (2018). "Mutualism". In Adams, Matthew S.; Levy, Carl. The Palgrave Handbook of Anarchism. Springer. pp. 213–224. .

External links 
 Carson, Kevin (2006). Studies in Mutualist Political Economy. BookSurge Publishing.
 Gambone, Larry (1996). Proudhon and Anarchism: Proudhon's Libertarian Thought and the Anarchist Movement]. Red Lion Press.
 Greene, William Batchelder (1850). Mutual Banking: Showing the Radical Deficiency of the Present Circulating Medium and the Advantages of a Free Currency.
 Kropotkin, Peter (1902). Mutual Aid: A Factor of Evolution.
 Lloyd, J. William (1927). Anarchist-Mutualism. Individualist anarchist criticism.
 Long, Roderick T., ed. (Winter 2006). Journal of Libertarian Studies 20 (1). This issue is devoted to Kevin Carson's Studies in Mutualist Political Economy and includes critiques and Carson's rejoinders.
 Reisman, George (18 June 2006). Mutualism: A Philosophy for Thieves. Mises Institute. Austrian School and Objectivist criticism.
 Swartz, Clarence Lee. (1927). What Is Mutualism?.
 Warren, Josiah (1829). Plan of the Cincinnati Labor for Labor Store. Mechanics Free Press.
 Weisbord, Albert (1937). "Mutualism". The Conquest of Power.
 Carson, Kevin, et al.'' [https://theanarchistlibrary.org/library/mutualists-org-a-mutualist-faq "A Mutualist FAQ". Mutualist: Free-Market Anti-Capitalism.

 
Anarchism
Anarchist schools of thought
Economic theories
Free-market anarchism
Individualist anarchism
Left-wing politics
Left-libertarianism
Libertarian socialism
Libertarianism by form
Market socialism
Pierre-Joseph Proudhon
Schools of economic thought
Social anarchism
Types of socialism